Plaskett's Star , also known as HR 2422 and V640 Monocerotis, is a spectroscopic binary at a distance of around 6600 light-years. It is one of the most massive binary stars known, with a total mass of around one hundred times that of the Sun. Indeed, it was long thought to be the most massive known binary system, but evidence collected between 1996 and 2005 demonstrated that Eta Carinae, which was previously thought to be a massive individual star, is a binary system.

This system is named after John Stanley Plaskett, the Canadian astronomer who discovered its binary nature in 1922. Plaskett was assisted in his observations by his son, Harry Hemley Plaskett. The pair of stars have a combined visual magnitude of 6.05, and are located in the constellation of Monoceros.

The brightness varies irregularly from 6.0 to 6.1 on a timescale of a few hours, thought to be due to many factors including the binary orbit, hot spots in the colliding winds, and granulation.
The luminosities of each component are much lower than expected for their spectral types.  It has been suggested that the star may be twice as far away as assumed, not a member of the Monoceros OB2 association, and each component would be about four times as luminous as currently calculated.  The masses derived from the binary orbit are also somewhat higher than expected from the spectral types, but with considerable uncertainty due to assumptions about the inclination.

References

Monoceros (constellation)
Spectroscopic binaries
O-type supergiants
O-type giants
Monocerotis, V640
2422
047129
BD+06 1309
031646